The mayor of Cabuyao is the highest ranking-officer and serves as the chief executive of the city. He enforces all laws and ordinances relative to the governance of the city and in the exercise of its appropriate corporate powers, as well as implements all approved policies, programs, projects, services and activities of the city. The mayor has a term of office of three years, but has a maximum electoral tenure of three consecutive terms.

During the American period, the first town mayor of Cabuyao was Captain Sotero Batallones after he peacefully surrendered to the Americans through the intervention of his nephew, Jose Batallones. He was temporarily removed from office when he was suspected as part of the party that abducted prominent residents of Cabuyao in July 1904. Luis Bella, the vice mayor then of Mayor Batallones, was installed as the town mayor. On September 7, 1904, Captain Sotero Batallones reassumed her position as mayor of Cabuyao.

The present 1987 Constitution of the Philippines defined the position, powers and responsibilities of the mayor as well as the city charter.



List

Town of Tabuko (1571-1904)

 1571 Gaspar Ramirez

Municipality of Cabuyao (1904-2012)

American Era

Japanese Occupation

Liberation Period

City of Cabuyao (since 2012)

History of the City Government
The following lists incorporate all people who became members of the city council or the Sangguniang Panlungsod of Cabuyao. The city council is always headed by the presiding officer, the City vice mayor.

City council, 2013-2016

City council, 2012-2013

History of the Municipal Government
The following lists incorporate all people who became members of the municipal council or the Sangguniang Bayan of Cabuyao. The municipal council is always headed by the presiding officer, the municipal vice mayor.

Municipal council, 2010-2012

Municipal council, 2007-2010

Municipal council, 2004-2007

Municipal council, 2001-2004

Elections
 1998 Cabuyao local elections
 2001 Cabuyao local elections
 2004 Cabuyao local elections
 2007 Cabuyao local elections
 2010 Cabuyao local elections
 2013 Cabuyao local elections
 2016 Cabuyao local elections
 2019 Cabuyao local elections
 2022 Cabuyao local elections

See also
 Cabuyao, Laguna
 Laguna
 History of Cabuyao

References

External links
Official Website of the City of Cabuyao
Cabuyao Laguna Site
The Spirit of Cabuyao

Cabuyao
Cabuyao